Duobrachium is a monotypic genus of comb jellies belonging to the order Cydippida, family unknown. The only species is Duobrachium sparksae.

Discovery
It was discovered and identified based only on video footage of three specimens after being observed by the Deep Discoverer robotic vehicle, operated by the US National Oceanic and Atmospheric Administration.

Physical characteristics 
The animal has a rectangular shape when viewed in the tentacular plane, but oval from the perpendicular plane. It has two long tentacle arms which protrude from the centre of the sides of the body, and extend downwards. These are about a third as long as the body. The animals use these to adhere to the seafloor.

References 

Tentaculata
Monotypic ctenophore genera